GP Andromedae (often abbreviated to GP And) is a Delta Scuti variable star in the constellation Andromeda. It is a pulsating star, with its brightness varying with an amplitude of 0.55 magnitudes around a mean magnitude of 10.7.

System
GP Andromedae is a main sequence Population I star of spectral type A3, placing it in the instability strip of the Hertzsprung-Russell diagram where Delta Scuti variables lay.

A visual companion star 11 arcseconds away, named TYC 1739-1526-2, shares a common proper motion and has a similar distance (measured by parallax) as GP Andromedae. There is no proof, however, that the two stars are gravitationally bound.

Variability
The observed variability of GP Andromedae is typical for a Delta Scuti variable; it's a purely monoperiodic radial pulsating star with a period of 0.0787 days. The period of pulsations is slowly and continuously increasing, matching the predictions of stellar evolution models for Delta Scuti variables.

References

Andromeda (constellation)
Andromedae, GP
J00551814+2309494
004322
Delta Scuti variables
A-type main-sequence stars